Georges Jean Painvin (28 January 1886 – 21 January 1980) was a French geologist and industrialist, best known as the cryptanalyst who broke the ADFGX/ADFGVX cipher used by the Germans during the First World War.

Early life
Painvin was born into a family of graduates from the École polytechnique and mathematicians from Nantes. In addition to his remarkable scientific education, the young Painvin was also a keen cello player, where in 1902 he was awarded First prize for cello at the Nantes Conservatory of Music.

In 1905, Painvin passed his matriculation exam into the École polytechnique. In his second year, he opted for admission to the Corps des mines where he would make his profession. However, French military service would briefly take him away from this fulfilment. On 7 September 1907, Painvin was appointed reserve second lieutenant and assigned to the 33rd Artillery Regiment to attend his third year on obligatory military service. In 1909 and again in 1911, he attended only short periods of military service lasting a few days. It was not until 1908 that Painvin entered the École Nationale Supérieure des Mines for three-years study, where he would be ranked 4th of the 6 students in his class. On completion Painvin graduated to engineer.

In 1911, Painvin became professor of palaeontology at the Ecole des Mines de Saint-Étienne and from 1913 at the École des mines de Paris. On 1 September 1911, Painvin was promoted further in his military service to lieutenant and reassigned to the 53rd Artillery Regiment the following year. In October 1913, Painvin also completed a probationary period at the École supérieure de guerre (French Army War College), which resulted in Painvin being assigned to the staff service on 6 April 1914.

Painvin's teaching career would unfortunately be interrupted by the onset of the First World War. When the conflict broke out, Painvin was naturally recalled into the French army.

Initial cryptanalysis
Painvin was assigned to the staff of General Maunoury's 6th Army, with whom he served as an orderly officer. Under General Maunoury, Painvin participated in the Battle of Ourcq in particular. However, Painvin's position gave him relative freedom to allow him to be interested in cryptology and ciphers. On befriending a Captain Paulier of the French army, who introduced Painvin to telegram and communication systems, Painvin would later perform cryptanalysis for the French war effort. Painvin had no training in cryptology but showed considerable passion for these "ciphers".

Painvin asked that he be given intercepted cryptograms transmitted by the invading Imperial Germany. It did not take long before Painvin made himself known in the field of cryptanalysis. He was assigned to the "Cabinet noir", the French black room which he would occupy until the end of the War. The encrypted telegram messages would consist of both military and diplomatic communications, some transmitted as far as between Berlin and Constantinople. There, he concentrated on the ciphers of the Imperial German Navy, then of the Austro-Hungarian Navy, which until his joining had remained entirely incomprehensible. He managed to break the ciphers, allowing a more efficient hunt for German submarines (U-boats). On 21 January 1915, Painvin proposed a method, the ARC system, which made it possible to discover the cryptographic key used for the encryption and this with a single text.

The German troops used several cipher systems, but this did not discourage Painvin, on the contrary. Accompanied by a Colonel Olivari, Painvin set upon attacking the triliteral ABC cipher. After two weeks of work, the two cryptanalysts managed to reconstruct the encrypted messages despite having false messages voluntarily sent by the Germans. One path of encrypted diplomatic communications in particular, led to the unravelling of the spy Mata-Hari; during the first months of the war, Painvin's work made it possible to quickly follow the evolution of this enemy figure.

In 1917, the Germans introduced the KRU field cipher. More complex with one cryptographic key per army unit, it would nevertheless be the subject of a meticulous analysis on the part of Painvin and a Captain Guitard.

The "Radiogram of Victory"

During the spring of 1918, Paris was constantly being bombarded by German Gotha G.IV bomber aircraft and heavy artillery. The French were unable to crack the newly introduced ADFGX cipher (designated by the German Imperial Army as "Geheimschrift der Funker 1918", in short: GedeFu 18) being used by the Germans from 1 March 1918 and thus could not predict their attacks. On 5 April 1918, shortly after the Germans launched their Spring Offensive, Painvin discovered two cryptographic keys used for the new ADFGX cipher and was able to decipher the new German cipher system. He relied on it for messages dated from 1 April.

In June 1918, the German Imperial Army was preparing for a final push on the Western Front to cover the 100 kilometres that separated it from Paris. The Allies needed to know where the German attack would come. But, at this worst stage of the War, the German cipher system had become more complex from 30 May, by adding the letter "V" (ADFGVX cipher) to the earlier ADFGX cipher method.

On 1 June 1918, the French listening station on top of the Eiffel Tower intercepted a German radio message for the first time, which not only contained the letters A, D, F, G and X, but also the letter V. The radio message came from the German army outposts in the region of Remaugies, north of Compiègne, and read:

 FGAXA XAXFF FAFVA AVDFA GAXFX FAFAG DXGGX AGXFD XGAGX GAXGX AGXVF VXXAG XDDAX GGAAF DGGAF FXGGX XDFAX GXAXV AGXGG DFAGG GXVAX VFXGV FFGGA XDGAX FDVGG A

Painvin recognized this and correctly concluded that the Germans had expanded the Polybius square from 5×5 to 6×6 and were now able to encode a total of 36 characters instead of the previous 25 letters. He also correctly suspected that the 26 letters of the alphabet plus the 10 digits (0 to 9) were used and based his cryptanalysis on this assumption. After some 26 hours of intensive work, until he was physically exhausted, he succeeded in reconstructing the grid and permutation used for the encryption and was able to decipher the intercepted message on 2 June 1918. The authentic plaintext message read in German:

 "Munitionierung beschleunigen Punkt Soweit nicht eingesehen auch bei Tag"

Translated into English: "Speed up supply of ammunition. If not seen also during the day".

The message was immediately forwarded to Marshal Ferdinand Foch's French headquarters and convinced him that the Germans were planning a massive attack in the section of the front at Compiègne. Foch concentrated his last reserve troops around this city, which meant that the German attack that took place here shortly afterwards could be repulsed.

Breaking the German ADFGVX cipher took its toll on Painvin's physical and mental health and shortly after the message was delivered, he collapsed, exhausted by all his efforts. In the aftermath of the Armistice, exhausted by these years of physical and mental effort, Painvin was forced to go into a long convalescence. On the French side, the German radio message has since been referred to as "Le Radiogramme de la Victoire".

For Painvin's painstaking efforts and determination, he was honoured and made a Knight of the Legion of Honour in a military capacity on 10 July 1918. He would, however, not be able to disclose or talk about his work accomplishments for a large part of his later lifetime, because the activities of a number of French government services were under cover of military secrecy from the general public until 1962. In December 1962, Painvin's contribution to the war effort in the field of code decryption was described by French General Desfemmes. On 19 December 1973, Painvin was elevated to the rank of Grand Officer of the Legion of Honour.

The inventor of the ADFGX/ADFGVX cipher, the German signal corps officer Lieutenant , did not learn of Painvin's achievement until 1967. In 1966, nearly fifty years later, Fritz Nebel learned that his system had been broken during World War I and said that he had originally proposed a double column transposition as the second stage of his method. However, his proposal was rejected in discussions by his superiors and, for practical reasons, they decided in favor of a (cryptographically significantly weaker) simple column transposition. Two years later, in 1968, Nebel and Painvin met in person and Nebel expressed his feelings by saying that the enemies of yesterday meet as the friends of today. Painvin emphasized that if it had been done as Nebel suggested, he certainly would not have been able to break the encryption.

The American cryptologist Herbert Yardley in The American Black Chamber would say of Painvin:

After 1918
After the War, Painvin resumed and continued his teaching activities part-time during the interwar period. He was also chairman of several companies, and participated in the strong growth for the company of Electrochemistry, Electrometallurgy and Electric arc furnace Steelworks of Ugine (abbr. ) during the 1920s, of which he was appointed director general in 1922.

The company mobilised new methods of electrochemistry to produce on a large scale the first stainless steels at affordable prices, helped by the French inventor and industrialist René Marie Victor Perrin (1893-1966), who developed the Ugine-Perrin process. The company would remain at the cutting edge of technology 40 years later with the inauguration of the giant Fos-sur-Mer steel plant near the Rhône.

In addition to the steelworks company in Ugine, Painvin chaired Crédit Commercial de France from 1941 to 1944. From 1934, he also contributed to the reorganization of the Paris stock exchange, which he presided over from 1940. He was also chairman of the chemical industries organizing committee, as well as of the Paris Chamber of Commerce (from January 1944). Several articles have studied Painvin's activity during the German military Occupation of France (1940-1944). Painvin was considered "a large-scale industrialist, who works very sincerely and very honestly with the German services"; and, "in the minds of many people, Mr. Painvin was regarded as pro-regime".

Under two demission directions before the court of justice of Seine and the Comité national interprofessionnel d'épuration (CNIE) (National Interprofessional Purification Committee) for acts of collaboration by French civilians during the German occupation of France, Painvin resigned as president and administrator of Ugine steelworks on 12 December 1945. In the aftermath of World War II, Painvin decided to step back and give up most of his functions.

In 1948, Painvin moved to Casablanca where he was entrusted in 1950 with the presidency of the industrial, financial and services conglomerate Omnium Nord-Africain, being also delegate president of the Société Chérifienne d'Exploitation d'Ouvrages Maritimes, of the Société Chérifienne du plâtre and member of the Casablanca Chamber of Commerce and Industry.

Painvin retired in 1962, and returned to France at the age of 76, he died in 1980 at the age of 93.

Literature
"The Codebreakers", 

The Annals of Mines: Georges Jean PAINVIN (1886-1980) (in French).

References and notes

École Polytechnique alumni
Mines Paris - PSL alumni
Corps des mines
Pre-computer cryptographers
French cryptographers
1886 births
1980 deaths
Military history of France